Selection may refer to:

Science 
 Selection (biology), also called natural selection, selection in evolution
 Sex selection, in genetics
 Mate selection, in mating
 Sexual selection in humans, in human sexuality
 Human mating strategies, in human sexuality
 Social selection, within social groups
 Selection (linguistics), the ability of predicates to determine the semantic content of their arguments
 Selection in schools, the admission of students on the basis of selective criteria
 Selection effect, a distortion of data arising from the way that the data are collected
 A selection, or choice function, a function that selects an element from a set

Religion 
 Divine selection, selection by God
 Papal selection, selection by clergy

Computing 
 Selection (user interface)
 X Window selection
 Selection (genetic algorithm)
 Selection (relational algebra)
 Selection-based search, a search engine system in which the user invokes a search query using only the mouse
 Selection algorithm, an algorithm that finds the kth smallest number in a list

Other uses 
 Preselection (or selection) of candidates in British elections
 Selection (Australian history), an area of crown land acquired under legislation
 Selected (album), the compilation album by Recoil
 Selection (album), by 54•40
 Selection (Nazi concentration camps)
 The Selection, a novel by Kiera Cass
 A store brand used by Metro Inc.

See also 
 Adverse selection
 Discrimination
 Election